Nelda Lee was a Boeing design and flight test engineer.  During her 45-year career (Lee retired in 2014), she considers her most memorable moment to be when she flew an F-15, supervised by Boeing test pilot Gary Jennings, a certified instructor.  As a result, Lee became the first woman to record flying time in an F-15.

She began her career with McDonnell Douglas. Over the course of her career, she oversaw four military aircraft including the F-15 Eagle, AV-8 Harrier, T-45 Goshawk, and F/A-18 Hornet.

Education
Lee was the second woman to receive a BS degree in Aerospace Engineering from Auburn University. Lee has an MA degree in Management and Human Resources Development from Webster University.

See also 
 Women in Aviation International Pioneer Hall of Fame

References

Auburn University alumni
American test pilots
Boeing people
Webster University alumni